Strabopidae is the only family of the order Strabopida, a group of arachnomorph arthropods.

The order Strabopida contains three valid genera and one doubtful, Khankaspis, Paleomerus, Parapaleomerus and Strabops, all assigned in the family Strabopidae. Previously, it also contained the genera Caryon, Lemoneites and Neostrabops, but after a study, they were reassigned as a trilobite, a glyptocystitid echinoderm and a cheloniellid arthropod, respectively.

Paleomeridae was also previously included as a family, but after the discovery of a fourth Paleomerus specimen and its study, Paleomeridae was synonymized into Strabopidae.

References

Strabopida
Prehistoric arthropod families
Controversial taxa